Lynn Shaler (born 1955) is an American artist known for her color aquatint etchings.  Many of her works feature locations in the city of Paris.  Early subjects often included objects such as doorknobs, envelopes, theater exits, a pair of shoes.  Later and more recent subjects often include architectural details or interior views opening onto an exterior scene.  Many of her works also feature a dog, a cat, umbrella(s) and/or a lady in a red/pink coat.  The majority of her works are made with multiple plates and many are, at least in part, hand-colored.

Biography 
Lynn Shaler studied printmaking at the University of Michigan and subsequently received a Master of Fine Arts degree from the Pratt Institute. In 1984, Shaler won a Fulbright scholarship to pursue postgraduate studies at Atelier 17 in Paris.  She has produced more than 200 etchings since 1975.  Her work can be found in collections at the Bibliothèque nationale de France (Paris), the Metropolitan Museum of Art (New York), the Library of Congress (Washington D.C.), and the Victoria and Albert Museum (London) – see below for a more comprehensive list.  Shaler has lived in Paris since 1988.

Solo exhibitions 

 2018: Across the Decades, Gallery 71, New York, NY
 2009:  Lynn Shaler: Etchings of Paris, Gallery 71, New York, NY
 2007: Gallery 71, New York, NY
 2007: Kendall Gallery, Wellfleet, MA
 2006: Jacob Fanning Gallery, Wellfleet, MA
 2005: Jacob Fanning Gallery, Wellfleet, MA
 2005: Gallery 71, New York, NY
 2004: Jacob Fanning Gallery, Wellfleet, MA
 2002: Gallery 71, New York, NY
 2002: Jacob Fanning Gallery, Wellfleet, MA
 2000: Esmay Fine Art, Rochester, NY
 2000: Jacob Fanning Gallery, Wellfleet, MA
 2000: Galerie Bréheret, Paris
 1999: Gallery 71, New York, NY
 1998: Esmay Fine Art, Rochester, NY
 1998: Jacob Fanning Gallery, Wellfleet, MA
 1998: Legacy Gallery, Newton, PA
 1997: Gallery 71, New York, NY
 1996: Shoestring Gallery, Rochester, NY
 1996: Galerie Bréheret, Paris
 1996: Jacob Fanning Gallery, Wellfleet, MA
 1995: Arnold Klein Gallery, Royal Oak, MI
 1994: Gallery 71, New York, NY
 1994: Shoestring Gallery, Rochester, NY
 1993: Galerie Bréheret, Paris
 1993: Galerie Champs Bleus, Paris
 1992: Galerie Corot, Paris
 1992: Newmark Gallery, New York, NY
 1992: Arnold Klein Gallery, Royal Oak, MI
 1992: Shoestring Gallery, Rochester, NY
 1991: Galerie Corot, Paris
 1990: Cultural Center of Ville d'Avray, France
 1990: Galerie Corot, Paris
 1990: Bunting Gallery, Ferndale, MI
 1989: Galerie Angle Aigu, Brussels, Belgium
 1989: Cité internationale des arts, Paris
 1989: Claude Gallery, Eastchester, NY
 1988: Galerie La Verrièe, Paris
 1987: Claude Gallery, Eastchester, NY
 1987: Schweyer/Galdo Galleries, Pontiac, MI

Collections 

The following collections contain Lynn Shaler's work:

 American Church in Paris
 Art Complex Museum, MA
 Bibliothèque Nationale de France, Paris
 Brooklyn Museum, NY
 Chemical Bank, Rochester, NY
 Detroit Institute of Arts
 Dulin Gallery of Art, TN
 Exxon Corporation, NY
 French Embassy, Madrid
 French Embassy, Santo Domingo
 Huntsville Museum of Art, Huntsville, AL
 International Bankers France, Paris
 International Graphics Arts Foundation, CT
 Kmart Corporation, Troy, MI
 Library of Congress, Washington D.C.
 Mainichi Newspapers, Paris
 Metropolitan Museum of Art, NY
 Michigan Blue Cross/Blue Shield
 Museum of Saint-Maur, France
 Newark Public Library, NJ
 New York Public Library, NY
 Oakland University, Rochester, MI
 Pratt Institute, NY
 State University at Potsdam, NY
 Trenton State College, NJ
 Victoria and Albert Museum, London

Awards 
 2014: The Kiyoshi Hasegawa Prize, Fondation Taylor, Paris.
2011: Michel Ciry Prize.
2003: The Marvin Bolotsky Purchase Prize, The International Miniature Print Exhibition, Center for Contemporary Printmaking, Norwalk, CT
 1994: First Prize – 3rd Biennial of Graphics, Museum of St. Maur, France
 1992: Third Prize – 2nd Biennial of Graphics, Museum of St. Maur, France
 1991: Jurors Award – Boston Printmakers 19th Annual Members Show, Art Complex Museum, Duxbury, MA
 1985: Henry B. Shope Award – 60th National Exhibition, Society of American Graphic Artists, NY
 1984: William H. Leavin Prize – 159th National Exhibition, National Academy of Design, NY
 1983: Professional Award – Colorprint U.S.A., Texas Tech University, Lubbock, TX
 1983: Associated American Artists Purchase Prize, NY
 1983: Jurors Mention Prize – Rockford College Biennial Print Exhibition
 1982: Purchase Prize – Prints U.S.A., Pratt Graphics Center, NY
 1982: Purchase Prize – National Print Exhibition, Trenton State College
 1982: Gladys Mock Memorial Award – 59th National Print Exhibition, Society of American Graphic Artists, NY
 1981: Purchase Prize – 15th National Dulin Print Exhibition, TN
 1981: Certificate of Merit – 156th Annual Exhibition, National Academy of Design, NY
 1980: Purchase Prize – 15th National Print Exhibition, State Univ. of Potsdam, NY
 1981: Murray Roth Memorial Award – 38th Annual Audubon Artists Exhibition, NY
 1979: Dr. & Mrs. Paul A. Bradlow Purchase Prize – 7th International Miniature Print Competition, Pratt Graphics Center, NY

References

Further reading 

 Shaler, Lynn, Diana Stork, and Kathleen Caraccio. Lynn Shaler: Fine Prints 1972-2017. 2018. Print.

External links
Galerie Bréheret (Paris vendor of Lynn Shaler's work)
Gallery 71 (New York vendor of Lynn Shaler's work)
Fitch-Febvrel Gallery (Croton-on-Hudson private vendor of Lynn Shaler's work)
Arnold Klein Gallery (online vendor of Lynn Shaler's work for the Michigan-based Arnold Klein Gallery)
Jozy Fine Art (Cape Cod vendor of Lynn Shaler's work)

1955 births
University of Michigan alumni
Pratt Institute alumni
American women printmakers
American etchers
Living people
American expatriates in France
20th-century American printmakers
20th-century American women artists
21st-century American printmakers
21st-century American women artists
Women etchers